Willie Simms (January 16, 1870 – February 26, 1927) was an American National Champion jockey in Thoroughbred racing and a U.S. Racing Hall of Fame inductee who won five of the races that would become the U.S. Triple Crown series.

An African American, Simms began racing in 1887 and was one of the most successful jockeys using the short-stirrup style (which gave the rider a crouching posture). En route to winning the United States riding title in 1893 and 1894, Simms won back-to-back Belmont Stakes. On August 17, 1894,  Willie Simms won the first five races at Jerome Park Racetrack and finished second in the sixth and last race of the day. All five of Simms' winners were trained by Hardy Campbell Jr.

In 1895, the Boston Post reported Willie Simms was among the elite jockeys and was earning more than $10,500 a year. (US$315,548 in 2018) That year he raced in England, where he became the first American jockey to win with an American horse in that country.

Back in the United States, Simms won the 1896 Kentucky Derby in its first running at 1¼ miles on Ben Brush. He repeated as the Derby winner in 1898, aboard Plaudit. Before the advent of the term "Triple Crown" and the importance of the U.S. Triple Crown series, Simms went on to take the Preakness Stakes a few weeks later on a different horse, Sly Fox. He is the only African American jockey to win all three Triple Crown races.

During his 14-year career, Willie Simms rode some of the great Thoroughbred racehorses of the day such as two-time American Horse of the Year, Henry of Navarre.

Willie Simms finished his riding career with 1,125 wins and in 1977 was inducted into the National Museum of Racing and Hall of Fame

His name was frequently misspelled as "Sims" by media of his era.

References

1870 births
1927 deaths
American Champion jockeys
African-American jockeys
American jockeys
Sportspeople from Augusta, Georgia
United States Thoroughbred Racing Hall of Fame inductees
20th-century African-American people